The Imperial Bank of Canada was a Canadian bank based in Toronto, Ontario, during the late 19th century and early 20th century.

History
It was founded in 1873 as the Imperial Bank in Toronto by Henry Stark Howland, former vice president of the Canadian Bank of Commerce. The bank became the Imperial Bank of Canada in 1874.

In 1875, the president of the Imperial Bank of Canada was H.S. Howland, founder of the original Imperial Bank. The bank had a capital of $1,000,000 and the head office was located on Wellington Street in Toronto, Ontario.

The Imperial Bank of Canada branches expanded beyond Toronto and were found in St. Catharines, Ingersoll, Welland, Prince Albert, Saskatchewan  and Port Colborne.

In 1875, it amalgamated with the Niagara District Bank, which had been chartered on May 19, 1855, in Montreal.

Although George Albertus Cox became the bank's president in 1890, Howland stayed at the bank until his death in 1902. Cox remained president until 1906. Daniel Robert Wilkie succeeded Cox as president of the Imperial Bank of Canada and died as president in 1914.

The bank acquired Weyburn Security Bank in 1931 and Barclays Bank (Canada) in 1956.

It merged with the Canadian Bank of Commerce in 1961 to form the Canadian Imperial Bank of Commerce.

See also

 List of Canadian banks

References

Defunct banks of Canada
Canadian Imperial Bank of Commerce
Banks disestablished in 1961
Banks established in 1873
1873 establishments in Ontario
1961 disestablishments in Ontario
1961 mergers and acquisitions